Lactarius albocarneus is a member of the large genus Lactarius (order Russulales), known as milk-caps. Found in Europe, the species was first described in 1895 by German mycologist Max Britzelmayr.

See also
 List of Lactarius species

References

albocarneus
Fungi of Europe
Fungi described in 1895
Taxa named by Max Britzelmayr